Sherif  popularly known as Choreographer Sherif (born 16 April 1981, Coimbatore) is a talented and a well-known Indian choreographer who has worked predominantly in Tamil, Telugu, Malayalam and Kannada movies. He also featured as an actor in films.

Career 

He started out as a contestant on a reality show, ultimately grew into a prominent choreographer in the film industry, to setting up a dance school, the Coimbatore lad Sherif’s evolution has been both unique and moving.

In 2009, he won the Dance Reality Show "Ungalil Yaar Adutha Prabhu Deva". After tasting success in it, he is now the most sought after choreographer for many prominent directors in the cinema industry.

Choreographer Sherif has given extraordinary dance steps, and he experiments a lot with his dance steps. He shot to fame with the song "Kasu Panam" from Soodhu Kavvum. He’s choreographed for more than 100 songs and even made Superstar Rajinikanth shake a leg to his dance moves in Petta. He has achieved great heights in the film industry in a short span of time. He has also acted in films, Sherif made his acting debut in the film Vetriselvan in a supporting role.

He also launched a dance company named Sherif’s Dance Company in Chennai.  He was one of the mentors on Kings of Dance Season 2. Choreographer Sherif, recently became the first Indian to join the Global Dance Council (GDC), he is the convener of Global Dance Council (GDC). and is coming up with a structured syllabus for dancers.

Filmography

References 
8. https://www.thenewsminute.com/article/watch-making-marana-mass-song-rajinikanths-petta-out-92642

Sources
 Gear up for the semi finals of Kings Of Dance 2 - Times of India
 Reimagining the art of dance!
 Reimagining the art of dance!
 Sherif's three choreographed songs in Vijay-Atlee's Theri
 M Sherif on Moviebuff.com
A certification for Kuthu dance? It’s possible now
Enroll to study all dance forms under one forum
The Global Dance Council Launches The Indian Chapter
Check out what the experts have to say on the International Dance Day | Coimbatore News - Times of India
https://www.thenewsminute.com/article/watch-making-marana-mass-song-rajinikanths-petta-out-92642
https://www.dailymotion.com/video/x7xavnv
https://mobile.twitter.com/sherif_choreo
https://instagram.com/sherif_choreographer



Indian Tamil people
Indian male dancers
Indian choreographers
1980 births
Living people